Masllorenç is a municipality in the comarca of the Baix Penedès in Catalonia, Spain. It is situated on the slopes of the Miramar range (864 m). A local road links the municipality with El Pla de Santa Maria, and with the A-2 autopista and the T-200 road. Masllorenç became part of the Baix Penedès in the comarcal revision of 1990: previously it formed part of the Alt Camp.

Demography

References

 Panareda Clopés, Josep Maria; Rios Calvet, Jaume; Rabella Vives, Josep Maria (1989). Guia de Catalunya, Barcelona: Caixa de Catalunya.  (Spanish).  (Catalan).

External links
 Government data pages 

Municipalities in Baix Penedès
Populated places in Baix Penedès